Vernon Randolph "Lefty" Harrison (July 13, 1919 – March 18, 1978) was an American baseball pitcher in the Negro leagues. He played with the Newark Eagles in 1939.

References

External links
 and Seamheads

1919 births
1978 deaths
Baseball players from Virginia
Baseball pitchers
Newark Eagles players
Sportspeople from Portsmouth, Virginia
20th-century African-American sportspeople